Joseph Gilbert Yvon Jean Ratelle (born October 3, 1940) is a Canadian former ice hockey player who played for the New York Rangers and Boston Bruins. He featured in three Stanley Cup Finals (1972, 1977, 1978). In twenty-one seasons he averaged almost a point a game and won the Lady Byng Trophy twice in recognition of his great sportsmanship. He was inducted into the Hockey Hall of Fame in 1985.

In 2017 he was named one of the "100 Greatest NHL Players" in history.

Playing career
Ratelle's hockey career almost ended at age 23 when he suffered a serious back injury and had to undergo major spinal cord surgery. He recovered to become a regular with the Rangers from 1963 to 1975. His greatest success came with linemates Vic Hadfield and Rod Gilbert in the "GAG Line" (i.e. Goal-a-Game Line). He led the Rangers in scoring between 1968 and 1973 when the team was a powerhouse among the league's best.

Ratelle was poised to beat out Boston Bruins' legend Phil Esposito for the scoring title in 1972 when he had to sit out fifteen games due to an injury, but came back for the Stanley Cup finals against Boston to lead his team. Only three other players - Esposito, Bobby Orr and Johnny Bucyk - had scored as many points in any season as Ratelle had done in his shortened season. His 109 points that season remained a Rangers' scoring record until 2006, when Jaromír Jágr broke it.

In November 1975, Ratelle was traded with Brad Park and Joe Zanussi to the Boston Bruins for Esposito and Carol Vadnais. Rangers general manager Emile Francis made the trade out in part out of respect so that Ratelle did not have to relocate his family far, plus the Bruins had sought Ratelle's skills at center.

With the Bruins for the remainder of the 1975-76 season, Ratelle scored over 100 points that season for the second time in his career.  He played five more seasons with Boston, gaining admiration for his slick passing, skill at faceoffs and all-around excellent play.

At the time of his retirement after the 1980-81 season, Ratelle was the league's sixth all-time leading scorer. While he never played on a team that won the Stanley Cup (being a finalist in 1972, 1977, and 1978), he was a member of the 1972 Team Canada squad that defeated the Soviet Union in the first Summit Series. He was well known as a gentlemanly player, finishing in the top five for the Lady Byng Memorial Trophy for sportsmanship and excellence nine times, including a stretch between the 1970 and 1978 seasons where he was in the top-three six times and won the trophy twice.

Post-playing career
Ratelle retired as a player after the 1980-81 season and remained in the Bruins organization, serving for four years as an assistant coach and then sixteen years as a scout.

In 1985, Jean Ratelle was inducted  into the Hockey Hall of Fame.

In the 2009 book 100 Ranger Greats, the authors ranked Ratelle at No. 7 all-time of the 901 New York Rangers who had played during the team's first 82 seasons.

On August 28, 2017, the Rangers announced that they would retire Ratelle's number 19 jersey on February 25, 2018; this was done in a pre-game ceremony.

Career statistics

Regular season and playoffs

International

See also
 List of NHL statistical leaders
 List of NHL players with 1000 games played
 List of NHL players with 1000 points

References

External links
 

1940 births
Living people
Baltimore Clippers players
Bill Masterton Memorial Trophy winners
Boston Bruins coaches
Boston Bruins players
Canadian ice hockey coaches
Canadian ice hockey centres
Guelph Biltmore Mad Hatters players
Guelph Royals players
Hockey Hall of Fame inductees
Ice hockey people from Quebec
Kitchener Beavers (EPHL) players
Lady Byng Memorial Trophy winners
Lester B. Pearson Award winners
National Hockey League players with retired numbers
New York Rangers players
Trois-Rivières Lions (EPHL) players
Canadian expatriate ice hockey players in the United States